Greg Alan Jones (born November 15, 1976) is an American former professional baseball pitcher. He attended Seminole High School.

He made his Major League Baseball debut on July 30, . Since 2003, Jones has pitched 47 innings in 38 games with a career ERA of 5.48. On December 12, 2007, Jones signed a minor league contract with an invitation to spring training with the Los Angeles Dodgers and was assigned to play for the Las Vegas 51s. He was released by the Dodgers on July 6, . In March , he signed a minor league contract with the Cleveland Indians.

External links

1976 births
Living people
American expatriate baseball players in Canada
Anaheim Angels players
Arizona League Angels players
Arkansas Travelers players
Baseball players from Florida
Boise Hawks players
Cedar Rapids Kernels players
Edmonton Trappers players
Erie SeaWolves players
Lake Elsinore Storm players
Las Vegas 51s players
Los Angeles Angels players
Major League Baseball pitchers
Pasco–Hernando State Bobcats baseball players
Rancho Cucamonga Quakes players
Seminole High School (Pinellas County, Florida) alumni
Salt Lake Bees players
Salt Lake Stingers players
Southern Maryland Blue Crabs players